Mark Selby (born 1983) is an English professional snooker player.

Mark Selby may also refer to:
Mark Selby (musician) (1961–2017), American blues rock singer-songwriter
Marc Selby, fictional character on British soap opera Coronation Street

See also
Mark Selbee (1969–2014), American kickboxer